E-epidemiology (also known as Digital Epidemiology) is the science underlying the acquisition, maintenance and application of epidemiological knowledge and information using digital media such as the internet, mobile phones, digital paper, digital TV.  E-epidemiology also refers to the large-scale epidemiological studies that are increasingly conducted through distributed global collaborations enabled by the Internet.

The traditional approach in performing epidemiological trials by using paper questionnaires is both costly and time-consuming. The questionnaires have to be transformed to analyzable data and a large number of personnel are needed throughout the procedure.
Modern communication tools, such as the web, cell phones and other current and future communication devices, allow rapidly and cost-efficient assembly of data on determinants for lifestyle and health for broad segments of the population. Modern IT technology provides means for storage, organization and retrieval of large amounts of biological and lifestyle data, which will ensure more data and more reliable statistical results. Efficient number crunching computing, using modern analytical tools and simulation based inference procedures allow knowledge to be extracted from the resulting large and complex data-structures. 
Web portals directly connected to the studies enables instant feedback and information to the participants. It also allows animations and other web based tools linked to the questionnaires, which can increase the interactivity and facilitates flow of information between the study participant and the study centre. The web portal will also generate a possibility for the Universities to carry out the third assignment, which is to spread the knowledge generated at the University to the public.

Important aspects of e-epidemiology include the development of security and confidentiality preserving solutions to protect individual integrity and research data ownership. But entering an epidemiological trial via the Internet is probably safer than traditional manners. Accurate security programmes and firewalls are a critical condition for handling personal records over the Internet.

See also 

 Epidemiology
 Mathematical modelling of infectious disease
 World Community Grid
 HealthMap

References

External links
 MEB.ki.se - Professor Jan-Eric Litton (faculty homepage), Karolinska Institutet (Swedish website)
 https://web.archive.org/web/20060722224532/http://www.phi.man.ac.uk/Presentations/e-epidemiology.pdf

Epidemiology